Una familia de diez is a Mexican sitcom that premiered on Las Estrellas on March 22, 2007. The series is created by Jorge Ortiz de Pinedo and Pedro Ortiz de Pinedo. The series centers on the López household, a middle class Mexican family that live in an apartment which barely holds living space for them.

Series overview

Episodes

Season 1 (2007)

Season 2 (2019)

Season 3 (2019)

Season 4 (2020)

Season 5 (2020)

Season 6 (2021)

Season 7 (2021)

Season 8 (2022)

Season 9 (2022)

References 

Una familia de diez